American singer Darius Rucker gained fame as the lead singer of the American roots rock band Hootie & the Blowfish before emerging as a major country music singer in 2008. As a solo artist, his discography comprises seven studio albums, including five for Capitol Nashville. His singles since 2008 have all been released to the country music format, where he has had nine number-one singles on the Country Airplay chart: "Don't Think I Don't Think About It", "It Won't Be Like This for Long", "Alright", "Come Back Song", "This", "Wagon Wheel", "If I Told You", "For the First Time", and "Beers and Sunshine".

Studio albums

2000s

2010s

Compilation albums

Singles

2000s

2010s and 2020s

As featured artist

Other charted songs

Other appearances

Music videos

See also 
Hootie & the Blowfish#Discography

Notes

References 

Discographies of American artists
Country music discographies
Discography